The third USS Powhatan was a steam tug that served in the United States Navy from 1898 to 1928, was renamed USS Cayuga in 1917, and was later designated YT-12.

Construction and career
Powhatan, formerly Penwood, was built in 1892 by the Maryland Steel Company, Baltimore, Maryland. She was purchased by the United States Navy on 8 April 1898 and commissioned on 20 April 1898. Powhatan was first attached to the Auxiliary Naval Force based at Pensacola, Florida, from 11 June 1898 to 8 August 1898. Later she was assigned to the Pensacola Navy Yard as yard tug. In 1900 Powhatan served the Marine Hospital Service, United States Department of the Treasury, as a quarantine vessel at Reedy Island, Delaware. She returned to the U.S. Navy in 1901 as yard tug at the New York Navy Yard

On 1 December 1906 she was involved in a minor collision with a float off Pier 4 in the North River, causing slight damage to her port side. On 2 January 1909 she had a minor collision with tow steamer  in the East River off Pier 7, Brooklyn doing $300 in damage to Hiawatha. Powhatans captain was charged with violation of pilot rules and tried on 20 January.

On 1 September 1917 her name was changed to USS Cayuga. She was later given the alphanumeric hull number YT-12. Cayuga continued to be stationed at the New York Navy Yard until decommissioned on 20 April 1928. She was sold for scrapping on 5 June 1928.

References

External links
 Photo gallery at Naval Historical Center
 Photo gallery at navsource.org

Tugs of the United States Navy
1892 ships
Ships built in Sparrows Point, Maryland
World War I auxiliary ships of the United States
Spanish–American War auxiliary ships of the United States